Elections to Tower Hamlets London Borough Council were held on 5 May 1994.  The whole council was up for election and the Labour party gained overall control of the council from the Liberal Democrats.

Election result

Ward results

References

1994
1994 London Borough council elections
20th century in the London Borough of Tower Hamlets